Cobden may refer to:

People
 Richard Cobden, British manufacturer and politician

Places
Australia
 Cobden, Victoria
 Cobden Football Club
Canada
 Cobden, Ontario
New Zealand
 Cobden, New Zealand
United States
 Cobden, Illinois
 Cobden, Minnesota

Other uses
 Cobden Bridge, Southampton, England

See also
 Cobdenism, an economic theory named for Richard Cobden